Pixie Hollow was a massively multiplayer online role-playing game (MMORPG) addition to the Disney Fairies franchise that ran from 2008 to 2013. It was produced by DisneyToon Studios and developed by Schell Games. The game was released to coincide with the 2008 film, Tinker Bell and revolved around Tinker Bell, a fairy character created by J. M. Barrie in his play Peter Pan and incorporating her fairy friends from the Disney Fairies animated works by the Walt Disney Company.

Critical reception 
GameZone gave the game 6/10. The game received the Parents' Choice Award, Silver Honor. The game also received the Parents' Choice Approved award.

A 2008 article from the magazine Variety about the site voiced concerns from parents that introducing children to online games at a young age could "one day make them a 'World of Warcraft' addict".  A New York Times article from 2007 voiced much of the same in its discussion about young children on the Internet, and gave a short description of Pixie Hollow: "The site will ultimately allow users to play games ('help create the seasons') and interact with other 'fairies.' When avatars move across the screen, they leave a sparkling trail of pixie dust, a carefully designed part of the experience."

Gameplay 
The first steps of the game was creating an avatar using various combinations of physical features and clothing options and deciding the type of fairy the player would want to play as. After creating an avatar, the player was able to explore the land of Pixie Hollow and interact with some of the characters from the Disney Fairies franchise as well as other players of the game. While exploring the world of Pixie Hollow, players were able to play talent games in order to gain flowers and other items that in turn could be used at Fairy stores to buy clothing or furnishings for the Fairy's home. Overall, this game provided children and fans of the Disney Fairies franchise a chance to escape into the world of Pixie Hollow.

Closing 
Pixie Hollow closed on September 19, 2013. Its closure was poorly received by users, especially bloggers in the community, many of whom created petitions to "save Pixie Hollow". Such efforts seem to have been in vain;  the game closed as planned and has not reopened.

References 

 http://massive.joystiq.com/2010/05/14/mmo-family-a-parents-look-at-pixie-hollow/
 IGN
 http://fairies.disney.com/pixie-hollow-faq

Disney Fairies
Disney video games
2008 video games
Inactive massively multiplayer online games
Internet properties disestablished in 2013
Internet properties established in 2008
MacOS games
Massively multiplayer online role-playing games
Video games developed in the United States
Windows games